Douglas Rex Ewald (July 8, 1937 – October 20, 2021) was an American politician and consultant.

Ewald was born in Minneapolis, Minnesota and graduated from Minneapolis North High School. He received his bachelor's degree and his master's degree in hospital administration from University of Minnesota. Ewald lived in Minnetonka, Minnesota with his wife and family. Ewald served in the Minnesota House of Representatives from 1975 to 1982 and was a Republican.

References

1937 births
2021 deaths
Politicians from Minneapolis
People from Minnetonka, Minnesota
University of Minnesota alumni
Republican Party members of the Minnesota House of Representatives